Renishaw Hall is a country house in Renishaw in the parish of Eckington in Derbyshire, England. It is a Grade I listed building and has been the home of the Sitwell family for nearly 400 years. The hall is southeast of Sheffield, and north of Renishaw village, which is northeast of Chesterfield.

History
The house was built in 1625 by George Sitwell (1601–1667) who, in 1653, was High Sheriff of Derbyshire. The Sitwell fortune was made as colliery owners and ironmasters from the 17th to the 20th centuries.

Substantial alterations and the addition of the west and east ranges were made to the building for Sir Sitwell Sitwell by Joseph Badger of Sheffield between 1793 and 1808 and further alterations were made in 1908 by Sir Edwin Lutyens.
Renishaw had two owners between 1862 (when Sir George Sitwell succeeded in his infancy) and 1965, when Sir Osbert Sitwell (brother of Edith) gave the house to his nephew, Sir Reresby Sitwell, 7th Baronet. The 7th Baronet was the eldest son of Sir Sacheverell Sitwell and owned the hall from 1965 until 2009 when he bequeathed it to his daughter, Alexandra Hayward.

Architecture
The house was built in stages and has an irregular plan. It is constructed in ashlar and coursed rubble coal measures sandstone with crenellated parapets with pinnacles. It has pitched slate roofs.

Gardens

The gardens, including an Italianate garden laid out by Sir George Sitwell (1860–1943), are open to the public. The hall is open for groups by private arrangement. The park is listed in the Register of Parks and Gardens of Special Historic Interest in England as Grade II*.

See also
Grade I listed buildings in Derbyshire
Listed buildings in Eckington, Derbyshire

References

External links

Renishaw Hall and Gardens – Official website
Renishaw Hall Garden – information on garden history and design

Houses completed in 1625
Country houses in Derbyshire
Grade I listed buildings in Derbyshire
Historic house museums in Derbyshire
1625 establishments in England
Grade II* listed parks and gardens in Derbyshire
Grade I listed houses
Sitwell family
Eckington, Derbyshire